Max Büdinger (1 April 1828, Kassel, Germany – 22 February 1902, Vienna, Austria) was a German historian. He was a professor of general history at the University of Vienna (1872–99).

Bibliography 
 Die Universalhistorie Im Altertume (1895)

References 
"Büdinger, Max". The Jewish Encyclopedia. 1902. vol 3. p 420.
Warner (ed). "Büdinger, Max". Library of the World's Best Literature. 1893. vol 42. p 81.
Gubser. "Max Büdinger's Universal History". Time's Visible Surface. Wayne State University Press. Detroit. 2006. Chapter 4. pp 89 to 96.
"Contemporary Literature" (1870) 53 North British Review 271
(1892) 43 Zeitschrift für die österreichischen Gymnasien 539
Erich Marcks, "Geschicte mit ihren Hilfswissen-schaften" (1892) 13 Deutsche Literaturzeitung 500 (9 April 1892)
"German Literature" (1869) 27 The Saturday Review 94 (16 January 1869)
14 The Chautauquan 701

External links 
 Max Büdinger at the Wien Geschichte Wiki
 Büdinger at Deutsche Biographie

1828 births
1902 deaths
19th-century German Jews
20th-century German Jews
Historians of Europe
German people of Jewish descent
Converts to Protestantism from Judaism